Col de la Madone transmitter is a very large broadcasting centre operated by Radio Monte Carlo north of Fontbonne, near Nice and Monaco, in France. It was established in 1965 and was used until completion of Roumoules radio transmitter for longwave broadcasting, using 3 320 metres tall guyed mast radiators, which do not exist any more. It was used for broadcasting on 702 kHz and 1467 kHz. Both antennas consist of 2 guyed mast radiators insulated against ground. The masts of the antenna for 1467 kHz are 101 metres tall and oriented in North-South direction. The masts of the antenna for 702 kHz are oriented in East-West direction pointing towards Milan, as it is used for transmitting a radio program in Italian language toward Italy. The western mast of this antenna, which acts as reflector, has a height of 250 metres while the eastern mast which is the radiator is 215 metres taller.
A bit souther, there is close to a military radar site a centre for FM-broadcasting and on Mount Angel there is a 146 metres tall partially guyed tower, which consists of a grounded lattice tower as basement and a guyed mast radiator insulated against ground as top. It was built in 1946 and first used for mediumwave broadcasting, but is today used for TV-broadcasting. Nearby there is also the shortwave transmitter of RMC with several dipole walls.

References

External links 
 http://pagesperso-orange.fr/tvignaud/galerie/am/06col-madone.htm
 http://pagesperso-orange.fr/tvignaud/galerie/am/06fontbonne.htm

Radio masts and towers in Europe
Towers in France
Transmitter sites in France
1965 establishments in France

fr:Centre émetteur du Col de la Madone